Murdeshwar railway station is a station on Konkan Railway. It is at a distance of  down from origin. The preceding station on the line is Manki railway station and the next station is Chitrapur railway station.

There is proposal to terminate train from Bengaluru to Mangaluru numbered 16585/16586 at Murudeshwara railroad station.

References 

Railway stations along Konkan Railway line
Railway stations in Uttara Kannada district
Karwar railway division